Christie is a subway station on Line 2 Bloor–Danforth of the Toronto subway in Toronto, Ontario, Canada. It is located on the east side of Christie Street just north of Bloor Street West, and opened in 1966 as part of the original segment of the subway line. Wi-Fi service is available at this station.

Construction to make the station's main entrance wheelchair accessible by adding two elevators had begun by the fourth quarter of 2021. One elevator will link the street level, the concourse level, and the westbound platform; the other elevator will link the concourse level and the eastbound platform.

History
Christie station opened in 1966, as part of the first phase of the Bloor–Danforth line.

The station was damaged in 1976 when a fire was set on board a late-evening train. Nobody was hurt, but four cars of the train were destroyed and part of the station's platform area, including the tiled wall, suffered severe damage. During the repair parts of the trim were replaced with a different colour; red-brown instead of the original green tile.

Christie Street is named after Christy McDougall, wife of Peter McDougall, a landowner in the area. Historical documents indicate that the street was given her name by as early as 1835.

Nearby landmarks
Nearby landmarks include Korea Town and Christie Pits.

Surface connections

Transfers to buses occur at curbside stops on Christie Street at this station.

TTC routes serving the station include:

References

External links

Line 2 Bloor–Danforth stations
Railway stations in Canada opened in 1966